Studio One is a digital audio workstation (DAW) application, used to create, record, mix and master music and other audio, with functionality also available for video. Initially developed as a successor to the KRISTAL Audio Engine, it was acquired by PreSonus and first released in 2009 for macOS and Microsoft Windows.

In addition to the commercial editions of the software (known as Studio One Artist and Studio One Professional), PreSonus also distributes a free edition, with reduced functionality (known as Studio One Prime). The Professional edition is also available as part of the PreSonus Sphere monthly subscription program.

History

Early development and release (2004–2011) 

Studio One originally began development under the name K2, as a follow-up to the KRISTAL Audio Engine. Although development for this follow-up began in 2004, it transitioned in 2006 to a cooperation between PreSonus and KristalLabs Software Ltd., a start-up founded by former Steinberg employees Wolfgang Kundrus and Matthias Juwan. Kundrus was one of the developers for initial versions of Cubase, and established concepts for the first version of Nuendo. Juwan was the author of the original KRISTAL Audio Engine, wrote the specification for version 3 of the VST plug-in standard, and had also worked on multiple Steinberg products, including Cubase, Nuendo, and HALion.

KristalLabs then became part of PreSonus in 2009, and the former KristalLabs logo was used as the basis for the logo of Studio One.

The first version of Studio One was announced on 1 April 2009 at Musikmesse, and released on 27 September 2009. The final update for Studio One version 1 (v1.6.5) was released in July 2011.

Versions 2 & 3 (2011–2018) 
Version 2 of Studio One was announced on 17 October 2011, and released on 31 October 2011 (alongside the 2.0.2 update). This release of the software introduced multiple enhancements, including integration with Celemony Melodyne, transient detection & quantization, groove extraction, multi-track comping, folder tracks, multi-track MIDI editing, an updated browser, and new plug-ins.

The integration of Studio One version 2 with Melodyne was achieved via the creation of a new plug-in extension, known as Audio Random Access (ARA). This extension, developed jointly by PreSonus and Celemony, allows an audio plug-in to appear as an integrated part of the application.

Version 3 of Studio One was released on 20 May 2015. The new features included an arranger track, scratchpads for idea experimentation, the ability to chain together different effects and instruments, MIDI note effects, new plug-ins, and the ability to use curves in automation.

Versions 4 & 5 (2018–2022) 
Following teaser images on social media websites in the preceding weeks, version 4 of Studio One was announced via a YouTube live stream event on 22 May 2018, and released simultaneously. New features in version 4 included a chord track (with chord detection, transposition and chord substitution options), a dedicated drum editing interface, expanded drum machine & sampler plug-ins, AAF-format import/export functionality (to exchange data with other DAW applications), and support for version 2 of the ARA plug-in extension. 

Almost exactly a year later, on 21 May 2019, this functionality was expanded further with the live stream announcement and simultaneous release of version 4.5. New functionality introduced with version 4.5 included input channel gain staging and phase/polarity options, a built-in plug-in manager, M4A (AAC/ALAC) support, video export options, new grouping options, RMS metering, pre-fader metering, CPU multi-core optimization, and expanded macro features, alongside a new add-on for batch audio conversion & processing.

The release of version 4.6 was preceded by a launch party event, hosted by PreSonus at the Red Bull Studios building in London. Its release on 10 December 2019 included a re-designed and expanded version of the 'Ampire' guitar amplifier and effects plugin (including new effects pedal options), a re-designed content browser, and new templates & macros for podcast production.

Version 5 of Studio One, described as "ten years in the making", was announced via live-stream video on 7 July 2020. Features added in this new version included a full score editor (with features similar to that of PreSonus' notation software, Notion), a 'Show’ interface focused on supporting live performances, MIDI support enhancements (such as polyphonic expression, custom ROLI device support, and the ability to use MTC & MMC to synchronize Studio One with external clocks). Version 5 also added support for recording in 64-bit floating-point WAV format, bringing the maximum precision for recording & processing to 64-bit/384 kHz and thereby making Studio One one of the highest-resolution audio production and mastering applications available. Version 5.4 of the software, released in September 2021, added native support for Apple computers with Apple silicon chips, thereby providing improved performance on such machines (which would previously have run the application via 'Rosetta 2' emulation).

Version 6 (2022–present) 
Version 6 of the software (the first following PreSonus' acquisition by Fender in 2021) was both announced and released on 29 September 2022. The new release included enhancements focused on making the application "simpler [and] more intuitive" (as previously alluded to by Fender CEO, Andy Mooney), such as "smart" templates, additional UI customization, song lyric support, and cloud-based collaboration (via their PreSonus Sphere subscription service). Following the launch, Evan Jones, Fender CMO, stated that the company was "fully invested in supporting the continued expansion and adoption of Studio One as the total solution for professional and committed at-home creators."

Features

Standard DAW Features 

In addition to its other functionality, Studio One includes fundamental features which are common across most digital audio workstation software, such as the functionality found in multi-track recorders and audio mixing consoles, plus additional functions not possible with analog recording (such as undoing previous actions, editing without loss of information, use of virtual instruments, etc.).

Editions 
Studio One is available in 3 editions, each with a different license cost (if any) and set of features. The Professional edition is also available as part of the PreSonus Sphere monthly subscription program, which also includes other PreSonus software, such as Notion, and all of its available plug-ins.

Other Features 
The other core features of Studio One include the following:

 A multi-touch interface with drag-and-drop functionality and support for multiple screens, including HDPI displays.
 A separate Project-level interface, which contains tools for mastering, managing the metadata of, and exporting one or more songs simultaneously, including options for creating Red Book Standard CDs or disk images (Professional Edition only).
 A separate Show-level interface, designed for use in coordinating the entirety of live performances from a single location.
 Real-time audio time-stretching features.
 Integrated music score editor.
 Multiple automation patterns for tracks and plug-ins, including straight lines, exponential/parabolic curves, square waves, triangle waves, sine waves, etc.
 Support for the ARA/ARA2 extension for audio plug-ins, allowing them to closely integrate as part of the application.
 A chord track, with automatic chord detection from audio or MIDI tracks, and options for chord transposition and substitution (Professional Edition only).
 An arranger track, for navigating song sections and re-arranging them via drag-and-drop.
 A lyrics track, for attaching song lyrics to notese, either word by word or syllable by syllable (Professional Edition only).
 Scratch pads, for users to experiment with different song layouts without impacting the original version (Professional Edition only).
 Undo functionality across the mixing process, including for plug-ins, virtual instruments, routing, effects chains, and others.
 The ability to create chains of virtual instruments and/or effects (Professional Edition only).
 Support for MIDI Polyphonic Expression / Poly Pressure.
 Support for MTC and MMC, to synchronize Studio One with external clocks.
 MIDI note-level effects, such as an arpeggiator and a chord generator.
 A dedicated interface for editing programmed drums, including configurable kit piece names for each note pitch.
 Mix Engine effects: plug-ins that can be used to modify/bypass/replace the standard mixing processes for a specific bus/channel (Professional Edition only).
 Support for users to switch to the keyboard shortcuts from other DAW software, such as Pro Tools, Logic Pro, Cubase, and Sonar.
Compatibility with the Mackie Control Universal communications protocol (which combines functionality from Mackie Control, Logic Control and HUI), for interfacing with audio control surfaces.
Compatibility with Native Instruments Komplete Kontrol MkII series keyboards.

Add-Ons 
Introduced with version 2.6.2 in January 2014, add-ons are optional items, developed either by PreSonus, or by third-parties, which can be acquired separately from the PreSonus store to expand the capabilities of Studio One. This can include new functionality (often known as 'extensions'), plug-ins, virtual instrument presets, loops, and other assets. Example add-on functionality includes the Audio Batch Converter (released alongside version 4.5), which allows for the offline conversion and processing of multiple audio files simultaneously, including the use of both native and third-party plug-ins.

Add-ons are also available to expand Studio One Artist to include other functionality from the Professional edition, including VST/AU/ReWire plug-in support, MP3 support, and Studio One Remote support.

Studio One Remote 

Introduced alongside Studio One version 3 in 2015, Studio One Remote is an app for wirelessly controlling Studio One via a tablet device connected to the same network. Whilst originally released for the Apple iPad, Remote was subsequently released for Microsoft Windows & Surface tablets (February 2016), and for Android tablets (June 2017). It uses PreSonus' own UCNET protocol, which is used for network connectivity and remote control across multiple PreSonus products.

Aspects of Studio One functionality which can be controlled via Remote include:

 The mixing console, including inserts, sends, inputs, outputs, and cue mixes.
 The transport bar and timeline ruler, including markers and arranger sections.
 Track macro controls.
 Plug-in parameters.

Studio One Exchange 
Studio One Exchange (previously known as PreSonus Exchange when it was first released in January 2012, alongside version 2.0.4) is a service which allows registered Studio One users to exchange plug-in presets, MIDI files and other resources from directly within the application. The Studio One Browser allows users to explore, preview, download, and review items uploaded to this service by other users, as well as upload their own.

A re-designed version of Exchange, referred to as 'Exchange 2.0' was released as part of Studio One v4.6 on 10 December 2019.

Reception 
Studio One has received mostly positive reviews since its initial release. Common areas of praise include rapid workflow, cost-effectiveness, and usability.

Studio One won the Japanese V.G.P. (Visual Grand Prix) 'Gold' award for three consecutive years, in 2011, 2012, and 2013.

In 2012, readers of Resolution Magazine named Studio One (version 2) as the Resolution Award winner in the 'DAW' category.

In 2013, Studio One (version 2.5) won a M.I.P.A. (Musikmesse International Press Awards) award in the 'Best Recording Software' category. Other awards received in 2013 included the Visual Grand Prix Audio Excellence award (in the 'DAW' category), the ProSoundWeb & Live Sound International, Readers’ Choice Award, and Audio Media's 'Gear of the Year' award, and the C.I.F. (Customers in Focus) award from the music studio website DAWfreak.se.

In 2016, Studio One (version 3) won Music and Sound Retailer's award for 'Best Multitrack Recorder/Recording & Mixing Software of 2015' at NAMM.

Release history

See also 
Comparison of digital audio editors
List of music software

References

Further reading 
Studio References (2016-10-25). The Unofficial Studio One User's Manual. CreateSpace Independent Publishing Platform. .
PreSonus (2016-06-04). Studio One 3 - Reference Manual. CreateSpace Independent Publishing Platform. .
Edstrom Jr., William (2013). Studio One for Engineers and Producers. Hal Leonard Books. .
The O, Larry (2012). Power Tools for Studio One 2: Master PreSonus' Complete Creation and Production Software, Volume 1. Hal Leonard Corporation. .
Terry, David (2012). Alfred's Teach Yourself Studio One: Version 2.0. Alfred Publishing Company. .

External links 

Digital audio workstation software
Music production software
Music software
Audio editors
Audio mixing software
Audio software
Computer music software
Windows multimedia software
MacOS multimedia software
MacOS audio editors
2009 software